Football at the 2010 Summer Youth Olympics took place at the Jalan Besar Stadium in Singapore.

Medalists

Preliminary round

Group A

Group B

Semi-finals

5th-place match

Bronze-medal match

Final

Final ranking

Goalscorers

5 goals
 Felicidad Avomo
 Judit Ndong

3 goals
 Hilal Başkol

2 goals
 Romina Orellana
 Melisa Rodríguez
 Fatemeh Ardestani
 Dilan Akarsu
 Nazmiye Aytop
 Feride Serin

1 goal
 Francisca Armijo
 María Navarrete
 Leticia Nchama Biyogo
 Verónica Nchama
 Shahin Aflaki
 Brittaney Prescott
 Kubra Aydin
 Eda Duran
 Eda Karatas

 Own Goal (1 goal)'''

 Fatemeh Adeli for Turkey
 Eda Duran for Iran

External links
Match Results
Girls' Youth Olympic Football Tournament Singapore 2010 , FIFA.com
FIFA Technical Report

Football at the 2010 Summer Youth Olympics
2010 in women's association football